T-669.0 (770) class diesel locomotives, built by ČKD are six-axle, with two bogies. The wheel pairs are set in radius arms and have a simple coil spring suspension. The body is mounted on the frame with eight anchors. The locomotive is a hood unit type with an internal, eccentrically-positioned operator's cab.

Machinery
Located underneath the front hood is the traction assembly – a K 6 S 310 DR diesel engine and a TD 802 traction generator – and auxiliary machinery powered by the diesel engine via a hydrodynamic transmission. Chillers and ventilators are located here as well. TE 006 traction motors are axle-mounted on the wheel sets. Located underneath the rear hood are batteries and a supply of sand.

Variations
After modifications of the seating of the hood on the frame, the T 669.1 (771) and the wide-gauge version T 669.5 (770.8) were created at SMZ Dubnica.

Users
This class of locomotive, manufactured for Czechoslovak State Railways, Soviet Railways, and railways in Poland, Albania, India, Iraq and Syria numbers over 8,000 units, making it the largest series of locomotives ever manufactured in Czechoslovakia.

See also
 ChME3

References

 atlas vozidel (z roku 2009), Motorové lokomotivy v ČR a na Slovensku, M-Presse, Praha 2009
 Heiko Rüdiger: Der Flug der Hummeln. Die Diesellokomotiven der Reihen 770/772 in Tschechien und der Slowakei. edition bohemica, Himmelkron 2009, 
 Helmut Petrovitsch: Europas meistgebauter Dieselbrummer. In: eisenbahn-magazin 6/2014, S. 6–13
 Der Modelleisenbahner 8/1972, Fahrzeugarchiv, Seite 251, Organ des DMV

External links
 www.t669.org

T-669
Railway locomotives introduced in 1968
Co′Co′ locomotives
Standard gauge locomotives of Czechoslovakia
Standard gauge locomotives of Poland
Standard gauge locomotives of Albania
5 ft gauge locomotives